is a Japanese radio program broadcast by Nippon Cultural Broadcasting.

Summary 
The program is sponsored by GREE. The program itself and a short bonus evaluation program are available on the YouTube channel of the same company as well.

This is the first radio program hosted together by Kana Hanazawa and Sora Amamiya.

References

External links 

Official program homepage

Japanese talk radio programs